Pauline Sophie Grabosch (born 14 January 1998) is a German track cyclist, representing Germany at international competitions. She won the silver medal at the 2016 UEC European Track Championships in the 500m time trial.

Major results
2016
3rd Team Sprint, Memorial of Alexander Lesnikov (with Emma Hinze)
3rd Team Sprint, Grand Prix of Tula (with Emma Hinze)
2017
GP von Deutschland im Sprint
1st Keirin
1st Team Sprint (with Miriam Welte
3rd Sprint
2nd 500m Time Trial, UEC European Track Championships
2nd Sprint, Cottbuser SprintCup

References

External links

1998 births
Living people
German female cyclists
Sportspeople from Magdeburg
UCI Track Cycling World Champions (women)
German track cyclists
Cyclists from Saxony-Anhalt
20th-century German women
21st-century German women